Punished by Rewards: The Trouble with Gold Stars, Incentive Plans, A's, Praise, and Other Bribes is a 1993 book by Alfie Kohn that argues against the use of rewards to incentivize behavior.

Further reading

External links 

 

1993 non-fiction books
Behaviorism
Books about education
American non-fiction books
English non-fiction books
Houghton Mifflin books